The 1985 Australian Manufacturers' Championship was a CAMS sanctioned motor racing title for car manufacturers. It was the 15th manufacturers title to be awarded by CAMS and the 6th to carry the Australian Manufacturers' Championship name. All championship rounds were open to cars complying with Australian Touring Car regulations, which were based on FIA Group A rules.

Calendar
 
The championship was contested concurrently with the 1985 Australian Endurance Championship over a five-round series with one race per round.
 Round 1, Better Brakes 300, Amaroo Park, New South Wales, 4 August
 Round 2, Pepsi 250, Oran Park, New South Wales, 18 August
 Round 3, Castrol 500, Sandown, Victoria, 15 September
 Round 4, James Hardie 1000, Mount Panorama Circuit, Bathurst, New South Wales, 6 October
 Round 5, Motorcraft 300, Surfers Paradise, Queensland, 27 October

Class Structure
Cars were grouped into three engine classes based on engine capacity: 
 Up to 2000cc
 2001 to 3000cc
 3001 to 6000cc

Points system
Championship points were awarded on a multi scale system for outright places gained at each round:
 Scale A was applied to cars in the Up to 2000cc class
 Scale B was applied to cars in the 2001 to 3000cc class
 Scale C was applied to cars in the 3001 to 6000cc class
Points were awarded only for the highest scoring car from each manufacturer at each round.

Results

Note: Only the top ten championship placing are shown in the above table.

References

Further reading
 Official Programme, Castrol 500, Sandown International Motor Racing Circuit, 14 and 15 September 1985

External links
 Images from 1985 Australian Touring Car racing Retrieved from www.autopics.com.au on 4 February 2010
 Images from the Bathurst round of the 1985 Australian Endurance Championship Retrieved from www.autopics.com.au on 4 February 2010

Australian Manufacturers' Championship
Manufacturers' Championship